The Glenn Highway (part of Alaska Route 1) is a highway in the U.S. state of Alaska, extending  from Anchorage near Merrill Field to Glennallen on the Richardson Highway.

Route description
The longest stretch of freeway in Alaska runs mostly along the Glenn Highway, beginning in north Anchorage, continuing onto the Parks Highway at the interchange of the two roads, and ending in the city limits of Wasilla, for a total of approximately 38 miles (61 km). This  portion of the Glenn Highway is the only road access to Anchorage for most of the state (with the exception of the Kenai Peninsula on the Seward Highway), and as such is the main traffic corridor for Anchorage's suburbs in the Chugiak-Eagle River and Mat-Su areas.

History
The highway originated as the Palmer Road in the 1930s, to reach the agricultural colony at Palmer. During World War II it was completed to Glennallen as part of a massive program of military road and base building that also resulted in the Alaska Highway, and connected Anchorage to the continental highway system.

It is named for Captain Edwin Glenn (1857–1926), leader of an 1898 U.S. Army expedition to find an Alaska route to the Klondike gold fields (the eventual Richardson Highway). The highway was paved in the 1950s.

Paleontology
The "Talkeetna Mountains Hadrosaur" specimen was discovered in 1994 in a quarry being excavated for road material. That fall, excavation began, and was resumed in the summer of 1996. The quarry is near the Glenn Highway, approximately 150 miles northeast of Anchorage.  This specimen was the first associated skeleton of an individual dinosaur discovered in all of Alaska.

Interstate Highway System

Glenn Highway is part of the unsigned part of the Interstate Highway System as Interstate A-1.

Major intersections

Gallery

Footnotes

References
 Pasch, A. D., K. C. May. 2001. Taphonomy and paleoenvironment of hadrosaur (Dinosauria) from the Matanuska Formation (Turonian) in South-Central Alaska. In: Mesozoic Vertebrate Life. Ed.s Tanke, D. H., Carpenter, K., Skrepnick, M. W. Indiana University Press. Pages 219–236.

External links

A journey down the Glenn Highway 
Alaska 101 Glenn Highway

Interstate Highways in Alaska
National Scenic Byways
State highways in Alaska
Transportation in Anchorage, Alaska
Transportation in Matanuska-Susitna Borough, Alaska
Transportation in Unorganized Borough, Alaska